The London Borough of Richmond upon Thames in southwest London forms part of Outer London and is the only London borough on both sides of the River Thames. It was created in 1965 when three smaller council areas amalgamated under the London Government Act 1963. It is governed by Richmond upon Thames London Borough Council and is divided into nineteen wards. The population is 198,019 and the major settlements are Barnes, East Sheen, Mortlake, Richmond, Twickenham, Teddington and Hampton.

The borough is home to Richmond Park, the largest park in London, along with the National Physical Laboratory and The National Archives. The attractions of Kew Gardens, Hampton Court Palace, Twickenham Stadium and the WWT London Wetlands Centre are within its boundaries and draw domestic and international tourism.

Settlement, economy and demography

The borough is approximately half parkland – large areas of London's open space fall within its boundaries, including Richmond Park, Kew Gardens, Bushy Park and Old Deer Park. The predominant other land use is residential. Most businesses within the borough consist of retail, property improvement/development and professional services. Parts of the borough, including Barnes, Richmond, St Margarets, Cambridge Park and Marble Hill, some areas of Twickenham and much of East Sheen rival Stanmore Hill and Kenley as the highest house-price districts and neighbourhoods in Outer London.

In 2006, research commissioned by a major mortgage lender found that, on the quantitative statistical indices used, the borough had the best quality of life in London and was in the top quarter of local authorities nationwide.  A neighbouring authority in Surrey achieved the best quality of life in that report.

Demography is a diverse picture as in all of London: each district should be looked at separately and even those do not reflect all neighbourhoods.  Whatever generalisations are used, "the fine-grained texture of London poverty" by its minutely localised geography must always be taken into account according to an influential poverty report of 2010. Richmond upon Thames has the lowest child poverty rates in London at 20% and contains at least one ward with an above-average level (for London) of working-age adults receiving out-of-work benefits but even this borough – reflecting the best result – has two standard poverty indices of sixteen in which it is placed in the worst quarter of boroughs.

Ethnicity

Richmond is one of London's wealthiest boroughs on many measures. It has the lowest rates of poverty, child poverty, low pay, child obesity and adults without level 3 qualifications of any London borough, according to a 2017 research project by Trust for London.

London's German business and expatriate community is centred on this borough, which houses the German School London (DSL) and most of the capital's German expatriates.

List of neighbourhoods
The local authority divides the borough into fourteen loosely bounded neighbourhoods, or "villages", with which residents broadly identify. Some of the neighbourhoods have the same name as their associated political ward, but the boundaries are not officially aligned. There is also no direct alignment between these areas and postcode districts, which tend to cover much broader areas, crossing the borough boundaries. Although most addresses in the borough have TW postcodes, some have SW and KT postcodes.

Attractions, parks and open spaces

Parks take up a great deal of the borough and include Richmond Park, Bushy Park, Kew Gardens, and Hampton Court Park.

The borough is home to the National Physical Laboratory and the attractions of Hampton Court Palace, Twickenham Stadium and the WWT London Wetlands Centre that draw domestic and international tourism.

The river Thames becomes narrower than at any part of Inner London towards its flow into the borough and becomes non-tidal at Teddington Lock in the borough; its main axis runs south to north, rather than west to east through more than half of the borough.

History
The borough was formed in 1965 by the merger of the Municipal Borough of Twickenham from Middlesex with the Municipal Borough of Richmond and the Municipal Borough of Barnes from Surrey; the new council's offices were at York House in Twickenham.

Coat of arms
The borough's history is reflected in the coat of arms, which was officially granted on 7 May 1966. It is: Ermine a portcullis or within a bordure gules charged with eight fleurs-de-lis or. The crest is: On a wreath argent and gules out of a mural crown gules a swan rousant argent in beak a branch of climbing red roses leaved and entwined about the neck proper. The supporters are: On either side a griffin gules, armed and beaked azure, each supporting an oar proper, the blade of the dexter dark blue and that of the sinister light blue. The portcullis was taken from the arms of the Municipal Borough of Richmond; the swan crest, from the arms of the Municipal Borough of Twickenham; and the griffin supporters and shield from the arms of the Municipal Borough of Barnes. Red, gold and ermine are the royal livery colours, reflecting Richmond's royal history. The swan represents the River Thames, which flows through the borough. The oars are from the Oxford University Boat Club and the Cambridge University Boat Club, reflecting the fact that the Boat Race between the two universities ends at Mortlake in the borough.

Politics

Council
Since its formation, the council has most often been led either by the Conservatives or by the Liberal Democrats. Currently, the Lib Dems make up the majority in the council.

Parliamentary representation

The borough is split into two constituencies, according to the river. On the north bank, there is the constituency of Twickenham and on the south bank there is the constituency of Richmond Park, which also contains some of the northern wards of the borough of Kingston.

Transport

Aviation 
London Heathrow Airport is located a short distance west, in the London Borough of Hillingdon.

Buses
The borough is served by many Transport for London bus routes.

Rail services
The borough is connected to central London and Reading by the National Rail services of the South Western Railway.

Richmond upon Thames isn't very well served by the London Underground compared with other boroughs in West London. Two stations, served by the District line, are located towards the borough's northeastern end: Richmond and Kew Gardens station. Both are also served by London Overground trains on the North London line, which connects Richmond with inner North London before terminating in Stratford. The southwestern end of the district, encompassing areas such as Twickenham are served instead by suburban railway services.

The other stations are: Barnes; Barnes Bridge; Fulwell; Hampton; Hampton Wick; Mortlake; North Sheen; St Margarets; Strawberry Hill; Teddington; Twickenham and Whitton.

Education

Richmond upon Thames is the local education authority for the borough.

Richmond upon Thames College opened in 1977 and was the first tertiary college in Greater London. The borough adopted a tertiary post-16 provision with virtually all 16-19 studies taking place at this college. This system lasted until 2012 when the council approved the creation of sixth forms in schools. Additionally the council approved the creation of a Catholic secondary school for the first time in the borough.

Sport and leisure
 

The borough has a non-League football club, Hampton & Richmond Borough F.C., who play at Beveree Stadium in Hampton. Twickenham Stadium hosts rugby internationals and the Twickenham Stoop is home to the Harlequins Rugby Team.

Richmond Rugby Club are also active and share their grounds with London Scottish F.C. The Richmond Minis is a large youth rugby organisation whilst the Richmond Heavies organise games for more veteran players.

Cricket is played in many locations around the borough including Ham Common, Richmond Green and Kew Green.

The River Thames flows through the borough and a number of sailing and rowing clubs are located along it. Richmond Canoe Club is situation a short distance up river from Richmond Bridge

The borough has a large amount of equestrian activity; this includes the Horse Rangers Association and Ham Polo Club.

Richmond's swimming pools, Pools on the Park, are located in Old Deer Park close to the town centre. The outdoor pool is open in the summer months only. There is also a heated outdoor pool in Hampton.

Arts and culture
The Twickenham Museum is a volunteer-run museum opposite St Mary's parish church.

The Museum of Richmond, in Richmond's Old Town Hall, close to Richmond Bridge, has displays relating to the history of Richmond, Ham, Petersham and Kew. Its rotating exhibitions, education activities and a programme of events cover the whole of the modern borough. The museum's highlights include 16th-century glass from Richmond Palace and a painting, The Terrace and View from Richmond Hill, Surrey by Dutch draughtsman and painter Leonard Knyff (1650–1722), which is part of the Richmond upon Thames Borough Art Collection.

Orleans House Gallery in Twickenham displays material from the London Borough of Richmond upon Thames' art collection. This includes a portrait of James Johnston by Thomas Gibson, paintings of Orleans House by Arthur Vickers and several other artists, and the Burton Collection, which includes artwork, personal effects and photographs of the explorer Richard Francis Burton. The gallery is also the site of the London Borough of Richmond upon Thames' arts service and provides educational workshops for a wide variety of ages, using the converted stables and coach house as educational spaces.

Garrick's Temple to Shakespeare in Hampton hosts a free Sunday afternoon Shakespeare exhibition from April to October and a series of summer drama, music and exhibitions.

Richmond has two theatres. The Richmond Theatre at the side of Little Green is a Victorian structure designed by Frank Matcham and restored and extended by Carl Toms in 1990. The theatre has a weekly schedule of plays and musicals, usually given by professional touring companies, and pre-West End shows can sometimes be seen. There is a Christmas and New Year pantomime tradition and many of Britain's greatest music hall and pantomime performers have appeared here.

Close to Richmond railway station is the Orange Tree Theatre which was founded in 1971 in a room above the Orange Tree pub. As audience numbers increased there was pressure to find a more accommodating space and, in 1991, the company moved to current premises within a converted primary school. The 172-seat theatre was built specifically as a theatre in the round. It has acquired a national reputation for the quality of its work for staging new plays, and for discovering undeservedly forgotten old plays and neglected classics.

Performance group Richmond Opera rehearse regularly at The Vineyard Centre.

The Cabbage Patch pub on London Road near Twickenham railway station has, since 1983, been a regular venue for live music on Sunday nights, organised by TwickFolk.

In 2015, Barnes, London became home to London's largest dedicated children's book event, the Barnes Children's Literature Festival, which is now the second largest in Europe.

Twin towns and sister cities
Richmond upon Thames is twinned with:
 Fontainebleau, France (since 1977)
 Konstanz, Germany (since 1983)
    Richmond, Virginia, United States (since 1980)

See also
List of people from the London Borough of Richmond upon Thames

References

External links

 Richmond upon Thames Council

 
1965 establishments in the United Kingdom
Richmond upon Thames
Richmond upon Thames
Populated places established in 1965